Leschères is a commune in the Jura department in Bourgogne-Franche-Comté in eastern France.

Population

Demonym
The inhabitants of the village are surprisingly known as Quilleux (meaning literally "skittle players"). The name owes its origin to the former existence of seven games of skittles in the village and its hamlets.

Politics and administration

See also

Communes of the Jura department

References

Communes of Jura (department)